The 1939–40 Norwegian Ice Hockey Championship season was the sixth season of ice hockey in Norway. 14 teams participated in the league, and Grane won the championship.

Results

First round
 Grane   
 Stabekk - Forward 3:1
 Bygdø - Ready 2:6
 B14 - Frisk 1:2
 Frogner - Holmen 1:3
 Gjøa - Furuset 0:4
 Strong - Heming 1:0
 Hasle

Second round 
 Grane - Stabekk 5:1
 Ready - Frisk 4:3
 Holmen - Furuset 5:2
 Strong - Hasle 0:2

Semifinals 
 Grane - Ready 4:0
 Holmen - Hasle 1:3

Final 
 Grane - Hasle 1:0

External links 
 Norwegian Ice Hockey Federation

Nor
GET-ligaen seasons
1939–40 in Norwegian ice hockey